Rev. James DeLong Williamson (March 12, 1849 – September 17, 1935) was an American minister and the seventh President of Western Reserve University, now Case Western Reserve University.

Williamson married Edith Day Ely on August 4, 1875, and together had four children.

In 1909, he was the founding pastor of the Church of the Covenant.

Williamson served as acting president (1912-1915) and executive vice president (1915-1921, 1924-1927) while as Society for Savings Bank.   In between, he was acting president of Western Reserve University, now Case Western Reserve University, from 1921 to 1923.

Williamson remained a trustee of Western Reserve University from 1905 until his death on September 17, 1935.  He is buried in Lakeview Cemetery in Cleveland, OH.

External links
 Case Western Reserve University bio

References

1849 births
1935 deaths
Burials at Lake View Cemetery, Cleveland
Case Western Reserve University faculty
Case Western Reserve University alumni
Presidents of Case Western Reserve University